Tuíza is one of 24 parishes (administrative divisions) in Lena, a municipality within the province and autonomous community of Asturias, in coastal northern Spain.  

The parish is the home of the Ubiña Massif (Macizo de Ubiña) of the Cantabrian Mountains.

Its post code is 33628.

Villages

The villages of Tuíza include:

 Tuíza Baxo, located at an altitude of 1,050 meters
 Tuíza Riba, 1,300 meters high, the pass to the Ubiña Massif
 El Quempu, at 1,100 meters

References

External links

 Asturian society of economic and industrial studies, English language version of "Sociedad Asturiana de Estudios Económicos e Industriales" (SADEI)

Parishes in Lena